= Louise McGuane =

Irish whiskey entrepreneur

Louise McGuane is an Irish whiskey entrepreneur. McGuane opened her own label, J.J. Corry Irish Whiskey, in 2016. J.J. Corry is the first female-owned Irish Whiskey House. The brand is specifically a restoration of a nearly lost production technique known as "bonding" wherein the base distilling process is crowdsourced, and then the primary distillery ages, blends, and fine-tunes the batches for wholesale.
